Visions of Death, also known as Visions, is a 1972 American television film starring Monte Markham and Telly Savalas.

Cast
Monte Markham
Telly Savalas

References

External links

Visions of Death at BFI

1972 television films
1972 films
American drama television films
1970s English-language films
1970s American films